Indira Naidoo-Harris is a Canadian former politician and journalist who was elected to the Legislative Assembly of Ontario in the 2014 provincial election, sitting as the member of Provincial Parliament (MPP) for Halton until 2018. A member of the Ontario Liberal Party, Naidoo-Harris was the province's minister of education in 2018, minister of the status of women from 2017 to 2018, early years and child care minister from 2016 to 2018, and associate minister of finance in 2016.

Background

Naidoo-Harris was born in Durban, South Africa under Apartheid. She immigrated to Canada as a child and grew up in Alberta. She graduated from the University of Lethbridge and moved briefly to the United States in Troy, New York, where she developed a broadcasting career with NBC and PBS before returning to Canada in the 1990s, eventually anchoring for CBC Ottawa, CITV in Edmonton, CTV National, CBC National, and Newsworld International.

Prior to the election, she was a CBC Radio newsreader and a CBC Television journalist. She lives in Milton, Ontario with her husband Randy.

Political career
Naidoo-Harris ran in the 2011 provincial election as the Liberal candidate in the riding of Halton. She was defeated by Progressive Conservative incumbent Ted Chudleigh by 3,148 votes. She ran again in the 2014 election against Chudleigh this time defeating him by 5,726 votes.

From 2014 to 2016 she was a Parliamentary Assistant to the Minister of Health and Long-Term Care. On June 13, 2016, she was named Associate Minister of Finance Responsible for the Ontario Retirement Pension Plan. On August 24, 2016 she was transferred from the pension role to a new educational ministerial position responsible for early year education and child care. In addition to her role as Minister Responsible for Early Years and Child Care, in January 2017, Minister Naidoo-Harris was also named Minister of the Status of Women. In January 2018, she was named Minister of Education and kept her role as Minister Responsible for Early Years and Child Care.

Naidoo-Harris was nominated to run for re-election as the Liberal candidate for the newly formed riding of Milton but was defeated in the ensuing election.

After politics 
In August 2019, Naidoo-Harris was appointed as the University of Guelph’s associate vice-president of diversity and human rights.

Electoral history

References

Notes

Citations

External links

Twitter
Facebook
LinkedIn

21st-century Canadian politicians
21st-century Canadian women politicians
CBC Television people
Canadian television reporters and correspondents
Canadian radio reporters and correspondents
Canadian politicians of Indian descent
Canadian women television journalists
Living people
Members of the Executive Council of Ontario
Ontario Liberal Party MPPs
People from Durban
People from Milton, Ontario
South African emigrants to Canada
South African people of Indian descent
University of Alberta alumni
University of Lethbridge alumni
Women government ministers of Canada
Women MPPs in Ontario
Canadian women radio journalists
Year of birth missing (living people)